The Association of Industrial Laser Users (AILU) was established in 1995 as an independent, non-profit organisation run by and for laser users involved in activities including manufacturing, healthcare, academic and industrial research; as well as suppliers of laser-related products and services.

The association promotes many activities surrounding Laser use, such as the fostering of co-operation and collaboration and the dissemination of information, experience and expertise relating to industrial laser technology, laser materials processing; its applications and related technologies.

Organisation 
The organisation of AILU is under the direction of an elected standing committee made up of representatives from the UK industrial laser community. Elections are held annually at the Annual General Meeting.

AILU provides a wide range of general services to laser users and suppliers and hosts a number of special interest groups (SIGs) to better support members who have particular interests in common. These include a Job Shop SIG (established in 1995, with 86 members) for subcontract laser-based engineering companies; a Market Development  SIG (established in 2005, with 240 members) for suppliers of laser-related products and services; a Medical SIG (established in 2007, with 55 members) for clinicians, manufacturers using lasers for manufacture of medical devices and suppliers of laser-related products and services; and the Micro:Nano SIG, AILU’s newest, launched in mid 2008 at AILU's 10th microprocessing workshop.”

Activities 
The current activities of AILU include:

The AILU magazine - a quarterly magazine
Workshops of topics of laser technology and applications.
A Product and Services Directory
Forums.
Consultancy services.
Surveys

AILU’s Membership 
Application for membership of AILU is open to the industrial laser community worldwide. AILU currently has over 300 members, which make up (by sector) manufacturing industry including laser job shops (40%), suppliers of laser-related products and services (30%) and research and consultancy organisations (25%).

The AILU Award 
The AILU award recognises those individuals who have made an outstanding contribution to the industrial use of lasers in the UK. The AILU Award is presented to an individual for significant contribution to laser materials processing and that preferably has wider benefit for the industrial laser user community.

References 
https://www.ailu.org.uk Association of Industrial Laser Users (AILU) website

Non-profit organisations based in the United Kingdom
Laser awards and associations